Barry Butler may refer to:

Barry Butler (footballer, born 1934), former Sheffield Wednesday and Norwich City player who died in a car crash in 1966
The Norwich City F.C. Player of the Season award, renamed The Barry Butler Memorial Trophy in honour of the above
Barry Butler (footballer, born 1962), former Chester City player
P. Barry Butler, president of Embry–Riddle Aeronautical University

Butler, Barry